Cardenal Antonio Samoré Pass is one of the main mountain passes through the southern Andes along the border between Argentina and Chile.

Together with Paso Libertadores, it is one of the easiest of the Argentina-Chile passes, and one of the few with asphalted roads in the region. The main towns and cities respectively on both sides of the pass are Entre Lagos and Osorno in Chile and Villa La Angostura and San Carlos de Bariloche in Argentina. From the Chilean side the pass is accessed through Route 215-CH, branch line which begins at the Panamerican Highway in Osorno. On the Argentinian side the pass is reached by Ruta Nacional 231.

Since 1974 there is a treaty that guarantee the transport of Chilean goods from the Chilean X Los Lagos Region to the XII Magallanes and Antártica Chilena Region over the Paso Samoré through the Argentinian Patagonia.

History
It is named after Cardinal Antonio Samorè, who mediated in the Beagle conflict between Chile and Argentina from 1978 to 1983. Operation Soberanía, the Argentine invasion plan, considered an offensive of the Third Army Corps under command of Luciano Benjamín Menéndez through Samoré Pass to seize Los Lagos Region.

Before it was renamed, it was known as Paso Puyehue after Puyehue Lake.

References

Mountain passes of Chile
Mountain passes of Argentina
Mountain passes of the Andes
Landforms of Los Lagos Region
Landforms of Neuquén Province
Argentina–Chile border crossings
Transport in Los Lagos Region
Nahuel Huapi National Park